The 145th Airlift Wing (145 AW) is a unit of the North Carolina Air National Guard. It is assigned to Charlotte Air National Guard Base, North Carolina and is equipped with the Boeing C-17 Globemaster III aircraft. If activated to federal service in the United States Air Force, the 145th is gained by Air Mobility Command.

Units
The 145th Airlift Wing consists of the following major units: 
145th Operations Group
 156th Airlift Squadron - C-17 Globemaster III
 156th Aeromedical Evacuation Squadron
 145th Operations Support Flight
145th Mission Support Group
145th Maintenance Group
145th Aircraft Maintenance Squadron
145th Medical Group
GSU
118th Air Support Operations Squadron
145th Security Forces Squadron

History

World War II

15 March 1948, the 156th Fighter Squadron was established and assigned to the North Carolina Air National Guard. It was federally recognized and activated at Morris Field, near Charlotte and was equipped with F-47 Thunderbolts. Its mission was the air defense of the state.

In 1950 the 156th was re-equipped with former World War II F-51 Mustangs, now designated RF-51D which had been used in the United States in a training role. The squadron became part of Tactical Air Command (TAC) as a Tactical Reconnaissance Squadron.

The 156th Fighter Squadron was federalized due to the Korean War on 10 October 1950. During its federalization period, the 156th was deployed to Toul-Rosières Air Base in France, departing for Europe in January 1952. On 9 July 1952 the activated North Carolina Air National Guard was released from active duty and returned to state control. Flying F-84D/E from 1950 to 1952.

In 1955 the facilities at Morris Field (now Charlotte Douglas International Airport) were expanded, two years later the 145th Fighter Group was organized consisting of the 156th Fighter Squadron and subordinate units.

The 145th Fighter Group was constituted and allocated to the Illinois Air National Guard, Chicago, IL on 28 May 1957. The unit began trading their F-86A Sabre, for the more capable F-86E Sabre.

North Carolina Air National Guard

The 145th Fighter Group (Air Defense) was assigned to the 126th Fighter Interceptor Wing, Illinois Air National Guard, Chicago, IL for mobilization. On 1 February 1961, The 145th Fighter Group (Air Defense), NCANG, was redesignated as the 145th Aeromedical Transport Group, NCANG and convert to C-119C Flying Boxcars.

The group was assigned to 1st Aeromedical Group, USAF, and Western Transport Air Force, (MATS), Travis AFB, CA, for training and flying evacuation missions. Transiting to C-121C/G transporters during 1962–1965.

On 25 January 1964 the 145th ATG was redesignated 145th Air Transport Group (Heavy). The unit began to convert to C-124C transporters during 1965. From 1966 to 1971 the 145th ATG was deployed to Vietnam, flying over 20 million km without an aircraft accident.

Re-designated 145th Tactical Airlift Group, 15 May 1971 and re-equipped with C-130B transport aircraft. In 1990 saw the unit mobilized for Operation Desert Shield, followed by Operation Desert Storm in 1991. On 15 Mar 1992, brought about another name change with the 145th Tactical Airlift Group become the 145th Airlift Group. During 1993 the group started to replace their elderly C-130Bs and take delivery of the more modern C-130H3.

1 Oct 1995, re-designated 145th Airlift Wing. On 7 September 2016 saw the end of its aerial firefighting mission using MAFFS (Modular Airborne Fire Fighting System) when it was transferred to the 152nd Airlift Wing, Nevada Air National Guard. There are two other C-130 Air National Guard MAFFS trained units, 153rd Airlift Wing, Wyoming Air National Guard, Cheyenne; the 146th Airlift Wing, California Air National Guard, Channel Islands, CA; and one Air Force Reserve unit, 302nd Airlift Wing, Air Force Reserve, Peterson Air Force Base, CO.

Wing's last C-130 departed on 22 December 2017 before the wing received its first C-17 Globemaster III on Saturday 7 April 2018.

Lineage

 Constituted 360th Fighter Squadron on 8 December 1942
 Activated on 12 December 1942
 Inactivated on 11 November 1945
 Re-designated: 156th Fighter Squadron and allocated to the North Carolina ANG on 24 May 1946
 Extended federal recognition on 15 March 1948
 Re-designated: 156th Fighter-Bomber Squadron on 10 October 1950
 Federalized and placed on active duty, 10 October 1950
 Released from active duty and returned to North Carolina state control, 10 July 1952
 Re-designated: 156th Fighter-Interceptor Squadron on 1 July 1955
 Re-designated: 145th Aeromedical Transport Group on 1 Feb 1961  
 Re-designated: 145th Air Transport Group (Heavy) on 25 Jan 1964
 Re-designated: 145th Military Airlift Group on 1 Jan 1966 
 Re-designated: 145th Tactical Airlift Group on 15 May 1971
 Re-designated: 145th Airlift Group on 16 Mar 1992 
 Re-designated: 145th Airlift Wing on 1 Oct 1995

Assignments
 356th Fighter Group, 12 December 1942 – 11 November 1945
 54th Fighter Wing, 15 March 1948
 123d Fighter-Bomber Wing, 10 October 1950
 116th Fighter-Interceptor Group, 10 July 1952
 116th Fighter-Bomber Group, 1 December 1952
 116th Fighter Group (Air Defense), 1 July 1955
 145th Fighter-Interceptor Group, 1 July 1957
 145th Aeromedical Transport Group, 1 February 1961
 145th Air Transport Group (Heavy), 25 January 1964
 145th Military Airlift Group, 1 January 1966
 145th Tactical Airlift Group, 15 May 1971
 145th Airlift Group, 15 March 1992
 145th Operations Group, 1 October 1995 – Present

Stations

 Westover Field, Massachusetts, 12 December 1942
 Groton Army Airfield, Connecticut, 9 March 1943
 Grenier Field, New Hampshire, 6 Jul-15 Aug 1943
 RAF Goxhill (AAF-345), England, 26 August 1943
 RAF Martlesham Heath (AAF-369), England, c. 10 Oct 1943 – 27 Oct 1945

 Camp Kilmer, New Jersey, 10–11 Nov 1945
 Morris Field (later Douglas IAP, Charlotte Air National Guard Base), North Carolina, 15 Mar 1948–Present
 Operated from: Godman AFB, Kentucky, 20 October 1950
 Operated from: RAF Manston, England, Nov 1951-10 Jul 1952

Aircraft

 P-47 Thunderbolt, 1943–1944
 P-51 Mustang, 1944–1945
 F-47D Thunderbolt, 1948–1949
 F-51D Mustang, 1949–1950; 1952–1955
 F-84 Thunderjet, 1950–1952
 F-86A Sabre, 1955–1957

 F-86E Sabre, 1957–1959
 F-86L Sabre Interceptor, 1959–1961
 C-119C Flying Boxcar, 1961–1962
 C-121 Constellation, 1962–1971
 C-130 Hercules, 1971–2017
 C-17 Globemaster III, 2018–present

Notes

Further reading
 
 Rogers, B. (2006). United States Air Force Unit Designations Since 1978.

External links
http://www.145aw.ang.af.mil/
 156th Airlift Squadron lineage and history
 AF Portal – 156th Weather Flight

156
Squadrons of the United States Air National Guard
Military units and formations established in 1992
Military units and formations in North Carolina